Young as You Feel may refer to:

 Young as You Feel (1931 film), an American comedy starring Will Rogers
 Young as You Feel (1940 film), an American comedy, part of the Jones Family series of films

See also
 As Young as You Feel, a 1951 film